"Canesadooharie" used to refer to the Huron River (Ohio); it is now commonly used to denote the Black River (Ohio).